Clarke Creek is a locality in the Isaac Region, Queensland, Australia. It is situated between Mackay and Rockhampton on the Old Bruce Highway.

History 
Clarke Creek State School opened on 17 May 1971.

Economy
Most of the citizens in the area own or work on cattle stations for a living. There is a service station which many car and truck drivers rely on. At the service station there is also a caravan park used by many temporary road workers in the area.

Education
Clarke Creek State School is a government primary (Prep-6) school for boys and girls at May Downs Road. In 2018, the school had an enrolment of 15 students with 3 teachers (2 full-time equivalent) and 6 non-teaching staff (2 full-time equivalent). The school has a tennis court, swimming pool, oval, playground facilities and amenities.

There are no secondary schools in Clarke Creek nor nearby. Distance education and boarding school are options.

Attractions 
Clarke Creek is known for its campdrafting and many come to see this event.

References

Towns in Queensland
Isaac Region
Localities in Queensland